Ecija Ivušić (born 1986) is a Croatian television and radio presenter, and former model.

Early life and education 
Ivušić was born in Zagreb. She studied journalism and graduated at the faculty of political science, University of Zagreb.

Career 
Ivušić's television career began when she co-hosted Hrvatska Traži Zvijezdu (Croatian Idol) in 2011. She went on to become a TV presenter for the Croatian Music Channel, during which she also worked as a TV presenter for Eurojackpot and the Croatian National Television's (HRT) show "4 Zida". She is currently a radio host for Extra FM, where she has her own radio show "Extra Dan."

References 

1986 births
Living people
Models from Zagreb
Croatian television presenters
Croatian radio presenters
University of Zagreb alumni
21st-century Croatian women
Croatian female models
Croatian women radio presenters
Croatian women television presenters
Television people from Zagreb